A Reichsverweser or imperial regent represented a monarch when there was a vacancy in the throne, such as during a prolonged absence or in the period between the monarch's death and the accession of a successor. The term  comes from the Old High German  and means "for or in the place of a person". The plural form is the same as the singular.

In the Holy Roman Empire, Reichsverweser were used periodically, but after its dissolution in 1806, the position was occupied only for one relatively short period during the German revolutions of 1848–1849. Although there were discussions about naming a Reichsverweser at the end of World War I and during the Nazi era, none was ever appointed. 

Positions similar to Reichsverweser have been used in Hungary, where they are called , in Finland and in Sweden.

Holy Roman Empire 

In the Holy Roman Empire's German and Italian territories, regents were called imperial vicars. For Germany, the Golden Bull of 1356 formally codified an earlier rule on imperial administration: the Count Palatine of the Rhine was imperial vicar for the territories under the Frankish civil law code (Salic Law), while the Elector of Saxony was vicar for the territories under Saxon law. Their powers included continuing the king's ongoing business, jurisdiction over the courts and granting certain imperial fiefs.

The imperial vicariate over Italy, which the popes at times claimed as their right, was disputed between the dukes of Savoy and Mantua. During the frequent absences of Emperor Frederick II in the 13th century, he appointed imperial governors as deputies and guardians for his sons Henry (VII) and Conrad IV.

Germany

German revolutions of 1848–1849 

On 28 June 1848, four months after the outbreak of the German revolutions of 1848–1849, the Frankfurt National Assembly created a Provisional Central Authority that was to take over the management of the executive branch for all of Germany until a constitution was adopted and a final head of state appointed. On the following day, Archduke John of Austria was elected Reichsverweser, an office that he was intended to hold until the National Assembly appointed an emperor as head of state. The power of John's government was limited, since the larger individual states in particular cooperated with it only when it suited their interests. Executive power remained with the individual states. After the revolution was suppressed in the summer of 1849, the Provisional Central Authority remained in office. It was not until 20 December 1849 that John transferred his powers to an Austro-Prussian Federal Commission.

Abdication of Emperor Wilhelm II 
In the final weeks of World War I, calls increased for the abdication of Prussian King and German Emperor Wilhelm II. Walter Simons, an advisor to Chancellor Max von Baden on international issues, thought that Wilhelm and the unpopular crown prince should abdicate so that a regency council could be established for the next heir to the throne, the then 12-year-old Wilhelm of Prussia. A law amending the constitution of the German Empire would have been needed to establish a Reichsverweser. Wilhelm II rejected the idea on 1 November 1918.

When the Social Democratic Party demanded the emperor's abdication, von Baden urged him plainly to step down. On 9 November 1918 he announced the abdication of Wilhelm II and the crown prince on his own authority. He thought that the abdication was imminent and that officials were simply working out the formulation of the announcement. He also feared that a revolution was imminent.

In a meeting with leading Social Democrats, von Baden transferred the office of chancellor to Friedrich Ebert. Baden's advisors had urged him to exercise the powers of the emperor as Reichsverweser in order to keep the question of the head of state open until a decision was made by a national assembly. But that same afternoon, the Social Democrat Philipp Scheidemann, acting on his own, publicly proclaimed a republic in Germany. Immediately afterwards the surprised and angry Ebert asked von Baden to become Reichsverweser, but he refused because he no longer believed such a course to be realistic.

Beginning on 12 November, the function of emperor and Reich chancellor (and, to some extent, of other state offices) was exercised by the Council of the People's Deputies, of which Ebert was one of the two chairmen. The Act on Provisional Reich Power of 10 February 1919 gave Germany a provisional constitutional order and, soon thereafter, a president and government. No Reichsverweser was ever named.

Nazi era 

In the 20 July 1944 plot to assassinate Adolf Hitler, it was envisioned that General Ludwig Beck would become provisional head of state as Reichsverweser after Hitler was killed. When the plot failed, Beck and many other members of the resistance were executed.

The anti-Nazi Kreisau Circle outlined its ideas for a German constitution after the end of Nazi rule in the "Principles for Reorganization" of 9 August 1943. The office of Reichsverweser that it contained was for the most part comparable to that of the Weimar Reich president. He would have appointed and dismissed members of the government, who under certain conditions could also have been removed by the Reichstag. The Reichsverweser would not have been elected by the people as under the Weimar constitution but by the Reichstag. The right of nomination was vested in a Reichsrat, a body that would include the heads of the states. The document set the Reichsweser's term of office at 12 years.

The Kreisau Circle's plans were never used. Most of its members were arrested following the failed July 20 plot to assassinate Hitler.

Hungary

Finland 

Finland belonged to the Russian Empire as a Grand Duchy from 1809 to 1917. After the abdication of Tsar Nicholas II in March 1917, the Finnish parliament in December 1917 declared the country independent without having decided on the final form of government. The chief minister Pehr Evind Svinhufvud acted as provisional head of state. After the German-Russian Treaty of Brest-Litovsk that ended Russia's participation in World War I, Finland briefly came under the influence of the German Empire in 1918. It led to the proclamation of the Kingdom of Finland in May 1918, for which Svinhufvud assumed the function of regent until a monarch yet to be chosen took office. In October 1918 the Finnish parliament elected the German prince Frederick Charles of Hesse as king. He initially accepted but never took office due to Germany's defeat in World War I and the subsequent German Revolution of 1918–1919. In December 1918 he formally renounced the crown.

At the same time, the former regent Svinhufvud resigned and was replaced by the commander-in-chief of the Finnish army, General Carl Gustaf Emil Mannerheim. While Svinhufvud had primarily needed to cooperate with the Germans to secure Finland's independence, Mannerheim was concerned with the international recognition of Finland by the victorious powers of the Entente as a sovereign state. Since the outcome of the war had made the retention of a monarchical form of government obsolete, Finland was proclaimed a republic in July 1919, and Mannerheim as regent was replaced by an elected president.

Sweden 
In Sweden imperial stewardship was held by the Jarl – a chieftain or prince – in the 13th century and by the Drots ('seneschal') in the 14th century. In 1438 the term Reich chief was used for the first time and still exists today. The  developed into an independent office during the Kalmar Union (1397–1523), not only representing the king of Sweden but also replacing him. Between 1470 and 1523,  ruled with only brief interruptions in 1497–1501 and 1520–21.

The office was abolished with the election of the  Gustav I as king in 1523. The title was revived from 1595 to 1599, when the future king Charles IX took over the government in Sweden in place of King Sigismund III Vasa, and in 1809, when the future Charles XIII replaced King Gustav IV Adolf.

The  is appointed by parliament and is a member of the royal family in accordance with the principle of succession to the throne, or if no such person is available, the president of parliament.

References

Regents
Regents of Germany
Regents of Sweden
Imperial vicars